Playz (stylised as playz) is an online service belonging to Radiotelevisión Española (RTVE), the Spanish public broadcaster, streaming free-to-air content for a young audience. It was launched on 30 October 2017.

History 
Embedded within the RTVE webpage, Playz was launched on 30 October 2017, with the release of Colegas, Dorien and Inhibidos. The launch was predated by the premiere of another original release on 11 September 2017, Si fueras tú, a transmedia fiction series loosely adapting the New Zealand series Reservoir Hill which served to promote the kickstart of the platform.

Programming 
The platform aims towards a young audience, from 15 to 35 years, intending to draw the interest from that demographics, with decreasing viewership figures in traditional television. Content includes original webseries, interactive documentaries, fiction stories in a podcast format, interactive cooking shows, a music and sport-centered section and a debate on current issues.

Fiction

Awards and nominations 

|-
| align = "center" | 2021 || 68th Ondas Awards || Best Entertainment Program || Content fom playz ||  || 
|}

References 
Citations

Bibliography
 

RTVE
Internet television channels
Internet properties established in 2017